Blanche is an unincorporated place and railway point in geographic Selwyn Township in the Unorganized North Part of Cochrane District in northeastern Ontario, Canada.

On a 1913 map, it is named as "Ogaming".

Blanche is also on Ogaming Creek, part of the James Bay drainage basin, which flows via the Flint River, Kenogami River and Albany River to James Bay.

References

Communities in Cochrane District